Peravia is a province in the southern region of the Dominican Republic.  Before January 1, 2002 it was included in what is the new San José de Ocoa province, and published statistics and maps generally relate it to the old, larger, Peravia.

It is named after the Peravia Valley. Along the Azua Province, Peravia is characterized by its dry climate and its dunes that surround the coast.  One popular attraction is the Salinas beach, which recently has grown to be a popular tourist destination with a developed town that has shops and hotels.

Municipalities and municipal districts 

The province as of June 20, 2006 is divided into the following  municipalities (municipios) and municipal districts (distrito municipal - D.M.) within them:

Baní
Catalina (D.M.)
El Carretón (D.M.)
El Limonal (D.M.)
Paya (D.M.)
Villa Fundación (D.M.)
Matanzas
Sabana Buey (D.M.)
Villa Sombrero (D.M.)
Nizao
Pizarrete (D.M.)
Santana (D.M.)

The following is a sortable table of the municipalities and municipal districts with population figures as of the 2012 census.  Urban population are those living in the seats (cabeceras literally heads) of municipalities or of municipal districts.  Rural population are those living in the districts (Secciones literally sections) and neighborhoods (Parajes literally places) outside of them.

For comparison with the municipalities and municipal districts of other provinces see the list of municipalities and municipal districts of the Dominican Republic.

Geography

Peravia province has an area of 792.33 km2 (305.92 sq mi). It is located in the southern region, it borders the San José de Ocoa province to the north, to the east it borders San Cristóbal, to the west the province of Azua and to the south it has coasts on the Caribbean Sea. The most important rivers that cross the province are the Nizao, the Ocoa and the Baní.

The province is made up of two main regions, the Central Mountain Range and the Coastal Plain of the Caribbean. The Central Mountain Range, known in the region as the Sierra de Ocoa, extends to the north and west of the province, where the hills of La Barbacoa are located at 1,743 meters above sea level, Valdesia with 1,723 meters above sea level, Firme Rodríguez, Los Guayuyos and Los Naranjos, El Manaclar with 1,400 meters above sea level, where most of the repeaters of the country's telephone companies are located and the surveillance radar of the south of the country.

La Barbacoa was declared a Scientific Reserve for the conservation of hydro-graphic basins and sources of streams and source aquifers such as the Rio Nizao. In the south of the province, in Las Calderas Bay, is the Los Corbanitos beach, Las Dunas, Salinas de Puerto Hermoso beach and the Las Caldera Naval Base of the Dominican Navy. About 80% of the Province is dominated by a dry forest, especially in its southern zone, in the north there are different types of humid forests.

Economy

The province has a diverse agricultural industry, producing vegetables (tomato, onion, etc.), fruit trees, coffee, onion, coconut, mango, lechoza, cashew, pigeon pea, rice and bananas. Beef farming of cattle and goats is also an important source of income, as well as fishing in the southern Caribbean coast.

Salt production in Las Salinas is produced on terraces through the evaporation of sea water, it is currently under the ownership of the Municipal Council of Baní. Currently a source of employment in the Province is the Punta Catalina Thermoelectric Power Plant.

References

External links 
  Oficina Nacional de Estadística, Statistics Portal of the Dominican Republic
  Oficina Nacional de Estadística, Maps with administrative division of the provinces of the Dominican Republic, downloadable in PDF format

 
Provinces of the Dominican Republic
States and territories established in 1944